Ondetia is a genus of flowering plants in the tribe Inuleae within the family Asteraceae.

Species
The only known species is Ondetia linearis, native to the Damaraland region of Namibia.

References

External links
Plants photographed on Kyffhäuser, Ondetia linearis Benth.  photo from Kyffhäuser in the Maltahöhe District, Namibia, with description in English

Inuleae
Flora of Namibia
Monotypic Asteraceae genera